is a Japanese actor. His first major role was as Tsubasa Yamagatana/Dan the Knight of the White Night in Garo Special: Byakuya no Maju. Yamamoto later portrayed Seiji Hayami in Cutie Honey: The Live. He also portrayed Takato Shiramine/Kamen Rider Rey in the Kamen Rider Kiva movie Kamen Rider Kiva: King of the Castle in the Demon World, and in the TV series as Taiga Nobori/Kamen Rider Saga. He is one of two actors to portray two different characters in a single Kamen Rider Series film and television series; the other is Kenji Matsuda in Kamen Rider Hibiki and Kamen Rider Hibiki & The Seven War Oni.

Filmography

TV, cinema, movie
 2006 - Garo Special: Byakuya no Maju as Tsubasa Yamagatana/Dan the White Knight
 2007 - Cutie Honey: The Live as Seiji Hayami
 2008 - Kamen Rider Kiva: King of the Castle in the Demon World as Takato Shiramine/Kamen Rider Rey
 2008 - Kamen Rider Kiva (Tokusatsu series) as Taiga Nobori/Kamen Rider Saga & Dark Kiva
 2009 - Kamen Rider: Dragon Knight (Tokusatsu series, Toei Channel) as Brad Barrett/Kamen Rider Thrust (Japanese dub)
 2010 - Katekyo Hitman REBORN! as Ugetsu Asari
 2011 - Yu-Gi-Oh Zexal as V, Yamikawa
 2012 - Garo: Makai Senki as Tsubasa Yamagatana/Dan the White Knight
 2012 - Garo: Soukoku no Maryu as Tsubasa Yamagatana/Dan the White Knight
 2012 - Metal Fight Beyblade Zero-G as Sakyo Kurayami
 2013 - Shougeki Gouraigan as Gan(Human form)
 2014 - HappinessCharge PreCure! as Blue
 2016 - Garo: Makai Retsuden as Tsubasa Yamagatana/Dan the White Knight
 2016 - Twin Star Exorcists as Kinasa
 2016 - Nanbaka as Kenshiro Yozakura
 2017 - Yu-Gi-Oh! VRAINS as Akira Zaizen
 2017 - Ultraman Geed as Dada (ep. 18)
 2019 - Beyblade Burst GT as Arthur Percival
 2020 - Haikyuu!!: To The Top as Hitoshi Ginjima
 2020 - Katekyo Hitman REBORN! the STAGE –SECRET BULLET- as Ottavio

Games
 2016 - Band Yarouze! as Yoshimune Tokuda
 Disgaea 5 as Void Dark

Dubbing
Bonnie & Clyde – Clyde Barrow (Emile Hirsch)
Max Steel – Maxwell "Max" McGrath / Max Steel (Ben Winchell)
Power Rangers Dino Force Brave – Juhyeok Kwon/Brave Gold Dino (Lee Seyoung)
Shock Wave – Wong Tin-nok

Discography
"Roots of the King (Acoustic Edit)" with Koji Seto (2009)

References

External links
Official blog 
Official agency profile 

1983 births
Living people
Japanese male video game actors
Japanese male voice actors
Japanese television personalities
Male actors from Osaka Prefecture
Osaka University of Arts alumni
People from Yao, Osaka